100 Best Workplaces in Europe is a ranking of the 100 workplaces in Europe performed each year by the Financial Times, in partnership with Great Place to Work. The list is based on employee surveys and a review of the company's culture. Two thirds of the total score is from employee responses to a 57 question survey on the culture of the company. The rest of the score is based on demographics, pay, benefits, culture, and community involvement.

The 2007 survey winner was the car manufacturer Ferrari of Italy.

External links
100 Best Workplaces in Europe

Working conditions
Surveys (human research)
Employer awards
Works about labor